Mykola Selivon is a Ukrainian jurist, judge, diplomat and former chairman of the Constitutional Court of Ukraine.

Selivon is from Chernihiv Oblast. His working career he started as a techinicain at a military unit stationed in Chernihiv. During that time he also served his obligatory military duty. In 1968 Selivon enrolled at the Kiev University. In 1973 he graduated the Kiev University Law Faculty and after a brief internship-like training at the NANU Institute of State and Law, until 1979 worked as a junior researcher at the institute.

In 1979-1996 Selivan worked at the legal department of the Office of Minister of the Council of Ministers.

In 1996-2005 he was a judge of the Constitutional Court of Ukraine. In 2005 at the presidential inauguration Selivon was administering an oath from the President of Ukraine Viktor Yushchenko.

In 2005-2006 as a professor he was lecturing at the National Academy for Public Administration. In 2006-2010 he served as the ambassador of Ukraine to Kazakhstan.

References

External links
 Mykola Selivon. Constitutional Court of Ukraine website.
 Mykola Selivon at the Official Ukraine Today
 Mykola Selivon. National Academy of Legal Sciences of Ukraine

1946 births
Living people
People from Chernihiv Oblast
University of Kyiv, Law faculty alumni
Koretsky Institute of State and Law alumni
Koretsky Institute of State and Law research associates
Ukrainian judges
Constitutional Court of Ukraine judges
Ukrainian presidential inaugurations
Academic staff of the National Academy of State Administration
Ambassadors of Ukraine to Kazakhstan